Sete Quedas is a municipality located in the Brazilian state of Mato Grosso do Sul. Its population was 10,771 (2020) and its area is 826 km².

References

Municipalities in Mato Grosso do Sul